The Truth About Christmas is the sixth overall album of gospel singer Vanessa Bell Armstrong, and third for major label Jive Records. This is the only holiday collection the artist has released, although she did contribute the song "Comfort Ye My People," a duet with Daryl Coley to the Grammy-winning special event Christmas album Handel's Messiah: A Soulful Celebration.

External links 

1990 Christmas albums
Christmas albums by American artists
Vanessa Bell Armstrong albums
Gospel Christmas albums